Charaxes bernardii is a butterfly in the family Nymphalidae. It is found in the Central African Republic.

Taxonomy
Treated as a junior Synonym (taxonomy) of Charaxes kheili kheili by Turlin, 2011.

References

External links
 African Charaxes/Charaxes Africains  Eric Vingerhoedt as synonym for Charaxes kheili
African Butterfly Database Range map via search

Butterflies described in 1978
bernardii
Endemic fauna of the Central African Republic
Butterflies of Africa